The East China Sea is an arm of the Western Pacific Ocean, located directly offshore from East China. The sea’s northern extension between mainland China and the Korean Peninsula is the Yellow Sea, separated by an imaginary line between the eastern tip of Qidong at the Yangtze River estuary and the southwestern tip of South Korea's Jeju Island.

The East China Sea is bounded in the east and southeast by the middle portion of the first island chain off the eastern Eurasian continental mainland, including the Japanese island of Kyushu and the Ryukyu Islands, and in the south by the island of Taiwan. It connects with the Sea of Japan in the northeast through the Korea Strait, the South China Sea in the southwest via the Taiwan Strait, and the Philippine Sea in the southeast via gaps between the various Ryukyu Islands (e.g. Tokara Strait and Miyako Strait).

China, Japan, the Korean peninsula and Taiwan lie within or border the East China Sea.

Geography
It is bounded on the east by Kyūshū and the Ryukyu Islands of Japan, on the south by the South China Sea, and on the west by the Asian continent. It connects with the Sea of Japan through the Korea Strait; it opens in the north to the Yellow Sea.

Countries with borders on the sea (clockwise from north) include: South Korea, Japan, Taiwan and China.

Extent
The International Hydrographic Organization defines the limits of the "Eastern China Sea (Tung Hai)" as follows:

On the South.
The Northern limit of the South China Sea [From Fuki Kaku the North point of Formosa to Kiushan Tao (Turnabout Island) on to the South point of Haitan Tao (25°25' N) and thence Westward on the parallel of 25°24' North to the coast of Fukien], thence from Santyo the Northeastern point of Formosa to the West point of Yonakuni Island and thence to Haderuma Sima (24°03′ N, 123°47′ E).
On the East.
From Haderuma Sima a line including the Miyako Retto to the East point of Miyako Sima and thence to Okinan Kaku, the Southern extremity of Okinawa Sima through this island to Ada-Ko Sima (Sidmouth Island) on to the East point of Kikai Sima (28°20' N) through Tanegra Sima (30°30' N) to the North point thereof and on to Hi-Saki (31°17' N) in Kyusyu.
On the North.
From Nomo Saki (32°35' N) in Kyusyu to the South point of Hukae Sima (Goto Retto) and on through this island to Ose Saki (Cape Goto) and to Hunan Kan, the South point of Saisyu To (Quelpart), through this island to its Western extreme and thence along the parallel of 33°17' North to the mainland.
On the West.
The mainland of China.

Rivers
The Yangtze River (Chang Jiang) is the largest river flowing into the East China Sea.

Islands and reefs

Senkaku Islands (Japanese) or Diaoyu Islands (Chinese), or Diaoyutai (Taiwanese). Disputed.
Tong Island

There is a cluster of submerged reefs in the northern East China Sea.  These include:

Socotra Rock, also called Suyan Rock or Ieodo, a subject of an EEZ dispute between the People's Republic of China and South Korea.
Hupijiao Rock
Yajiao Rock

Nomenclature
The sea is called the East Sea in Chinese (Dōng Hǎi), and is one of the Four Seas of Chinese literature. There are three other seas, one for each of the four cardinal directions.

In 2004, official documents of the Japanese Foreign Ministry and other departments switched to the name  (pronounced the same), which has become the standard usage in Japan.

Common usage in Indonesia refers to the sea as Laut Cina Timur (East China Sea). This name was used officially by the Indonesian government until 2014, when Indonesia switched usage from the word Cina to Tiongkok instead; since then, the name Laut Tiongkok Timur become standard usage in Indonesia. Despite this, many Indonesian media outlets and publications continue to use the former sea name.

History

Whaling
American whaleships cruised for right whales in the sea between 1849 and 1892.

EEZ disputes

There are disputes between the China] (PRC), Japan, Taiwan, and South Korea over the extent of their respective exclusive economic zones (EEZ).

The dispute between the PRC and Japan concerns the different application of the 1982 United Nations Convention on the Law of the Sea (UNCLOS), which both nations have ratified. China and Japan both claim 200 nautical miles EEZ rights, but the East China Sea width is only 360 nautical miles. China proposed the application of UNCLOS, considering the natural prolongation of its continental shelf, advocating that the EEZ extends as far as the Okinawa Trough. Its Ministry of Foreign Affairs has stated that "the natural prolongation of the continental shelf of China in the East China Sea extends to the Okinawa Trough and beyond 200 nautical miles from the baselines from which the breadth of the territorial sea of China is measured," which is applicable to the relevant UNCLOS provisions that support China's right to the natural shelf. In 2012, China presented a submission under the UNCLOS concerning the outer limits of the continental shelf to the UN. However, Japan claims about 40,000 square kilometers part of this territory as its own EEZ because it is within 200 nautical miles (370 km) from its coast, and thus proposed the Median line division of the EEZ.

 In 1995, the People's Republic of China (PRC) discovered an undersea natural gas field in the East China Sea, namely the Chunxiao gas field, which lies within the Chinese EEZ while Japan believes it is connected to other possible reserves beyond the median line. Japan has objected to PRC development of natural gas resources in the East China Sea near the area where the two countries Exclusive Economic Zone (EEZ) claims overlap. The specific development in dispute is the PRC's drilling in the Chunxiao gas field, which is located in undisputed areas on China's side, three or four miles (6 km) west of the median line proposed by Japan. Japan maintains that although the Chunxiao gas field rigs are on the PRC side of a median line that Tokyo regards as the two sides' sea boundary, they may tap into a field that stretches underground into the disputed area. Japan therefore seeks a share in the natural gas resources. The gas fields in the Xihu Sag area in the East China Sea (Canxue, Baoyunting, Chunxiao, Duanqiao, Wuyunting, and Tianwaitian) are estimated to hold proven reserves of 364 BCF of natural gas. Commercial operations began 2006. In June 2008, both sides agreed to jointly develop the Chunxiao gas fields, but they have never been able to agree on how to execute the plan.

Rounds of disputes about island ownership in the East China Sea have triggered both official and civilian protests between China and Japan.
 
The dispute between PRC and South Korea concerns Socotra Rock, a submerged reef on which South Korea has constructed the Ieodo Ocean Research Station. While neither country claims the rock as territory, the PRC has objected to Korean activities there as a breach of its EEZ rights.

Navy of the People's Republic of China (PRC)
In their sphere of naval operations along their littoral (in the East and South China Seas), China today possesses more naval vessels than those of the US Navy. US Presidents Barack Obama and Donald Trump have given priority to US naval operations, under the US Indo-Pacific Command, to expand its sphere of influence in the Pacific Ocean, to counter China's growing strength, and to be ready for any unforeseen challenges in the future.

Military activities 
Taiwan, Japan, China, and South Korea all conduct military exercises in the East China Sea.

East China Sea in astronomy
Possibly, East China Sea (Donghai in Chinese) is represented with the star Eta Serpentis in asterism Left Wall, Heavenly Market enclosure (see Chinese constellation).

See also 

 Geography of China
 Xihu Trough
 Ryukyu Islands
 Ryukyu Kingdom
 Okinawa Trough
 Senkaku Islands (Diaoyutai Islands in Taiwanese, Diaoyu Islands in Chinese)
 Philippine Sea
 Sea of Japan
 South China Sea

References

Further reading
 
 

 Medcalf, Rory. (2020) Indo-Pacific Empire: China, America and the contest for the world's pivotal region (2020) excerpt
 
 
 the United States. Congress. (2014).   Maritime Sovereignty in the East and South China Seas: Joint Hearing before the Subcommittee on Seapower and Projection Forces of the Committee on Armed Services Meeting Jointly with the Subcommittee on Asia and the Pacific of the Committee on Foreign Affairs (Serial No. 113-137), House of Representatives, One Hundred Thirteenth Congress, Second Session, Hearing held January 14, 2014

External links 

 Rising Powers Quarterly Volume 3, Issue 2, Aug. 2018,  special issue on "The "Indo-Pacific" - Regional Dynamics in the 21st Century's New Geopolitical Center of Gravity"
 Kosuke Takahashi. Gas and oil rivalry in the East China Sea Asia Times Online. 27 July 2004.
 Oil and gas in troubled waters The Economist. 6 October 2005.
 J Sean Curtin. Stakes rise in Japan, China gas dispute Asia Times Online. 19 October 2005.
 Chinese Suyan Rock community 
 Alexander M. Peterson's 2009 Note in the Cornell International Law Journal detailing the dispute, clarifying the legal impact of the 2008 Sino-Japanese arrangement to cooperate in the East China Sea, and proposing increased Sino-Japanese cooperation.
 China, Japan and the Energy Quest in the East China Sea by Amrita Jash, IPP Review (Singapore). 29 August 2017.

 
Seas of China
Seas of South Korea
Seas of Taiwan
Seas of Japan
Marginal seas of the Pacific Ocean
Temperate Northern Pacific
China Seas